"Maria Maria" is a 1999 song by Santana.

Maria Maria may also refer to:

María María, a Venezuelan TV series
Maria, Maria..., a novel by Boris Akunin
Maria Entraigues-Abramson, an Argentine-American singer, composer, and actress known as María María